Andre Townsend (born October 8, 1962) is a former defensive end who played 7 seasons for the Denver Broncos in the National Football League.  He started in Super Bowl XXI and Super Bowl XXII.

Townsend starred at the University of Mississippi after a standout high school career for the Aberdeen, Mississippi High School Bulldogs.

1962 births
Living people
American football defensive ends
Ole Miss Rebels football players
Denver Broncos players
African-American players of American football
Players of American football from Chicago
21st-century African-American people
20th-century African-American sportspeople